The 2011 Boston Breakers season was the club's third season in Women's Professional Soccer and their third consecutive season in the top division of women's soccer in the American soccer pyramid. Including the WUSA franchise, it was the club's sixth year of existence.

Review and events

Match results

Key

Preseason

Regular season
Note: Results are given with Boston Breakers' score listed first.

Playoffs
Note: Results are given with Boston Breakers' score listed first.

Club

Roster 

As of 18 July 2011.

 (Captain)

Management and staff 
Front office

Coaching staff

Standings 

Blue denotes team has clinched regular season championship.
Green denotes team has spot in 2011 Women's Professional Soccer Playoffs.
Red denotes team has been eliminated from playoff contention.

Source: WPS standings*magicJack was docked one point on 12 May for various violations of league standards.

Statistics

Field players

Awards

WPS Player of the Week

See also 
 2011 Women's Professional Soccer season
 2011 U.S. Open Cup
 2011 in American soccer
 Boston Breakers

References 

2011
American soccer clubs 2011 season
2011 Women's Professional Soccer season
2011 in sports in Massachusetts